Army Men: Green Rogue (Army Men: Omega Soldier  in Europe for the PlayStation) is a shoot 'em up video game developed and published by The 3DO Company for PlayStation 2 and PlayStation.

Gameplay
The game takes the form of top-down, forward scrolling shoot 'em up in the vein of Commando or Ikari Warriors. Unlike those games it features a 3D environment with polygonal enemies, instead of 2D sprites, and the screen is constantly scrolling forward.

Green Rogue was a newcomer in a long line of army men games from 3DO, many aimed at an arguably undiscriminating juvenile audience, with fair to middling critical responses. Despite that, Green Rogue featured some atypical gameplay, including multiple upgradeable weapons with nine levels of potency, a "biostrike" smart bomb, and a supersoldier mode. However, as lamented by one of the game's designers, some of that gameplay may have been overlooked by reviewers.

Reception

The PlayStation 2 version received "generally unfavorable reviews" according to the review aggregation website Metacritic.

David Chen of NextGen called it "a harmless enough diversion, but there are better ways to spend your time." David Smith of IGN complimented the FMV opening but added that once the opening movie ended the quality took "what Bill Hicks called 'a real big @#$%in' dropoff.'" He continued that everything in the game was sluggish. Tim Tracy of GameSpot was complimentary of the graphics, saying the game carried "some fairly smooth and detailed textures and is a decent game to look at", but was critical of the gameplay particularly collision detection and the constantly scrolling play field which he found made it difficult to manoeuvre to pick up power-ups and dodge enemy attacks.

Notes

References

External links

2001 video games
Army Men
Multiplayer and single-player video games
PlayStation (console) games
PlayStation 2 games
Shoot 'em ups
Video games developed in the United States